Kamila Kerimbayeva (Kamila Kerımbaeva; born 18 June 1995) is an inactive tennis player from Kazakhstan.

She has career-high WTA rankings of 291 in singles and 303 in doubles, and won 18 titles (ten in singles, eight in doubles) on the ITF Women's Circuit.

Playing for Kazakhstan Fed Cup team, Kerimbayeva has a win–loss record of 2–3.

On 25 September 2017, she was suspended from tennis for two years due to doping.

ITF Circuit finals

Singles: 16 (10 titles, 6 runner-ups)

Doubles: 21 (8 titles, 13 runner-ups)

References

External links
 
 
 

1995 births
Living people
Kazakhstani female tennis players
Sportspeople from Almaty
Tennis players at the 2014 Asian Games
Asian Games medalists in tennis
Asian Games bronze medalists for Kazakhstan
Medalists at the 2014 Asian Games
Doping cases in tennis
Kazakhstani sportspeople in doping cases
21st-century Kazakhstani women